Zalaqi may refer to various rural districts in Iran:
Pishkuh-e Zalaqi Rural District
Zalaqi-ye Gharbi Rural District
Zalaqi-ye Sharqi Rural District